This is a list of the National Register of Historic Places listings in Bandera County, Texas.

This is intended to be a complete list of properties listed on the National Register of Historic Places in Bandera County, Texas. There are four properties listed on the National Register in the county. One property is a State Antiquities Landmark and holds two Recorded Texas Historic Landmarks. The remaining properties are also designated as Recorded Texas Historic Landmarks.

Current listings

The locations of National Register properties may be seen in a mapping service provided.

|}

See also

National Register of Historic Places listings in Texas
Recorded Texas Historic Landmarks in Bandera County

References

External links

Bandera County, Texas
Bandera County
Buildings and structures in Bandera County, Texas